

The Hamble River H.L.1 Seaplane was a British pusher biplane seaplane designed by Frank Murphy and built by Hamble River, Luke & Co Limited at Southampton.

The H.L.1 was exhibited uncompleted at the exhibition at Olympia in February 1914 fitted with a  NAG C.II engine. It was ordered by the British Admiralty to be fitted with a  Gnome engine and issued with serial number 105. The H.B.1 was launched in May 1914 but partly sank and was damaged due to being unbalanced.  It was repaired and fitted with pontoon-floats and tested by Eric Gordon England without much success. It was not accepted by the Navy and was sold at auction in May 1915 for £30.

See also

References

Notes

Bibliography

 Ray Sturtivant and Gordon Page Royal Navy Aircraft Serials and Units 1911-1919 Air-Britain, 1992. 

Floatplanes
Single-engined pusher aircraft
1910s British aircraft
Biplanes
Hamble River aircraft